Antioch is an unincorporated community and census-designated place (CDP) in southwestern Harris County, Georgia, United States.

Antioch was first listed as a CDP prior to the 2020 census. Its population in 2020 was 613.

Demographics

2020 census

Note: the US Census treats Hispanic/Latino as an ethnic category. This table excludes Latinos from the racial categories and assigns them to a separate category. Hispanics/Latinos can be of any race.

References 

Census-designated places in Harris County, Georgia